°L may refer to:

 °Lintner, a scale for measuring enzymatic activity
 °Lovibond, a scale for measuring transparency